Harbour Glacier is a through glacier  long and  wide, lying on the northwest side of Wiencke Island and extending in a northeast direction from Port Lockroy to the cove  east of Noble Peak, in the Palmer Archipelago, Antarctica. It was probably first seen by the Belgian Antarctic Expedition, 1897–99, under Gerlache. The glacier was charted in 1944 by the Falkland Islands Dependencies Survey, who so named it because of its proximity to the harbour of Port Lockroy.

See also
 List of glaciers in the Antarctic
 Glaciology

References

Glaciers of the Palmer Archipelago
Wiencke Island